Will Creekmore (born April 9, 1989) is an American professional basketball player for Saitama Broncos of the B3 League. He played college basketball for Boston University and Missouri State. 

Creekmore signed with Ibaraki Robots of the B.League on August 5, 2019. On September 5, 2020, he signed with the Shiga Lakestars.

Awards and honors
2011 All-MVC Scholar-Athlete of the Year
2014 Eurobasket.com／All-British BBL Center of the Year
2014 British BBL Champion

Career statistics 

|-
| align="left" | 2016–17
| align="left" | Nishinomiya/TokyoZ
|39 ||37 || 31.8 ||.439  || .398 ||.752  || 11.7 || 2.4 || 0.7 ||1.2  || 18.4
|-
| align="left" | 2017–18
| align="left" | Yamagata
|56 ||48 || 28.2 ||.461  || .354 ||.704 || 8.8 || 2.7 || 0.8 ||0.7  || 17.1
|-

References

External links
Missouri State bio

1989 births
Living people
American expatriate basketball people in Canada
American expatriate basketball people in France
American expatriate basketball people in Germany
American expatriate basketball people in Japan
American expatriate basketball people in Luxembourg
American expatriate basketball people in the Philippines
American expatriate basketball people in the United Kingdom
American expatriate basketball people in Vietnam
American men's basketball players
Basketball players from Oklahoma
Boston University Terriers men's basketball players
Earth Friends Tokyo Z players
Missouri State Bears basketball players
Moncton Magic players
Nishinomiya Storks players
Passlab Yamagata Wyverns players
Saigon Heat players
Saitama Broncos players
Sportspeople from Tulsa, Oklahoma
Tulsa 66ers players
UJAP Quimper 29 players
Worcester Wolves players
Centers (basketball)
Power forwards (basketball)
Ehingen Urspring players
Shiga Lakes players
Ibaraki Robots players
ASEAN Basketball League players
American expatriate sportspeople in England